"Lowdown Popcorn" is a funk instrumental recorded by James Brown. It was the third hit single Brown recorded in 1969 that was inspired by the popular dance the Popcorn, preceded by the instrumental "The Popcorn" and the song "Mother Popcorn". It charted #16 R&B and #41 Pop.

The original studio recording of "Lowdown Popcorn" was included on Brown's 1970 album Sex Machine with added reverb and overdubbed crowd noise to simulate a live performance.

References

External links
 "Popcorn Unlimited", an article by Douglas Wolk about James Brown's "Popcorn" records

James Brown songs
1969 singles
1960s instrumentals
1969 songs
King Records (United States) singles
Songs written by James Brown